Greater Bank was an Australian customer-owned bank and is now a brand of Newcastle Greater Mutual Group, as a result of a merger in March 2023 with Newcastle Permanent Building Society.

The bank was earlier known as the Greater Building Society, or simply "The Greater”, and provides services to customers in New South Wales and southeast Queensland through branches, mobile lenders, its own ATM network, access to the Westpac ATM network, Internet and mobile banking, and a Newcastle-based customer service call centre.

The Bank is licensed by the Australian Securities and Investments Commission, is regulated by Australian Prudential Regulatory Authority as a bank and authorised deposit-taking institution, and is a member of the Customer Owned Banking Association (COBA). In 2013, the Bank was named Building Society of the Year for customer satisfaction by Roy Morgan Research, as judged by more than 50,000 consumers and 22,000 business decision-makers. This was followed up by wins in the Roy Morgan Research Bank of the Year category in 2016 & 2017.

History 
In 1924, Mr FW Lean and Mr KA Mathieson Snr formed the Newcastle and Hunter River Public Service Starr-Bowkett Building Cooperative Society Ltd, a Starr-Bowkett society, in response to unemployment and economic depression in Newcastle, New South Wales. By providing interest-free home loans to members, the society provided an opportunity for home ownership at a time when low wages and high rent otherwise made it impossible for many.

The Bank began as a building society, the Greater Newcastle Cooperative Permanent Building and Investment Society, which opened its first office in Newcastle, New South Wales in 1945. In 1946, it had assets of £11,000.

In 1968, the Society expanded outside the Hunter, opening its first Central Coast branch in Gosford. The Society’s first Sydney branch opened in 1972 in Penrith, and the first Illawarra branch at Warrawong opened in 1973.

In 1980 the Society expanded north to the New South Wales North Coast, establishing branches at Ballina and Coffs Harbour. In 2003, the Society established its first Gold Coast branch at Robina.

The Society merged with a number of building societies over the years. In 1998, it merged with the Mitchell Building Society of Central Western NSW, and in 2011 it merged with ABS Building Society of Armidale.

By 2014 its assets were over A$5 billion.

In May 2016, after receiving approval from its regulator APRA, the Society changed its name to Greater Bank. The ownership structure did not change, remaining as a mutual bank owned by customers, rather than shareholders.

In November 2022, the bank's members voted to merge the bank with Newcastle Permanent Building Society, to take effect in March 2023, provided regulatory approval.  Both brands were planned to continue.

Operations
Directors:
 Wayne Russell - Chair
 Jayne Drinkwater- Deputy Chair
 Roger Cracknell
 Catherine Robson
 Donna-Maree Vinci

Management:
 Scott Morgan - CEO

Advertising 

In 2010, Australian marketing guru John Dwyer tempted actor Jerry Seinfeld out of retirement, to be spokesman for the Bank. Seinfeld had only ever lent his name to two marketing campaigns; American Express and Microsoft. Seinfeld starred in the company’s advertising campaigns for three years. The comedian’s tenure as spokesperson for the Bank marked a rise in brand awareness both locally and nationally.

Charity 

The Bank established The Greater Charitable Foundation in 2011. The Foundation partners with Australian-based charitable organisations throughout the Bank’s area of operations with a goal of improving life outcomes and supporting families and communities.

The Foundation was established with an initial allocation of $1 million by the Bank on behalf of its members and staff. The Bank continues to fund the Foundation from its profits on an ongoing basis, and the Foundation is governed by an independent Board of Directors. A key platform of the Foundation’s activities is the involvement of the Bank's staff in funded projects through volunteering and pro bono assistance.

References

External links
 Official Website

Building societies of Australia
Banks established in 1945
Economy of Newcastle, New South Wales